McLeod Bay may refer to:
A bay on the Great Slave Lake in the Northwest Territories, Canada
A bay to the west of Whangārei Heads in Northland, New Zealand